A Thousand Lights in a Darkened Room is the only release by Black Light District, an alias for English experimental group Coil. The alias was one of a few assumed by them in the mid-nineties for releasing purely experimental music.

Background
"Unprepared Piano" is a reference to the prepared piano technique created by John Cage, of whom Coil are said to be fond. "Blue Rats" was later remixed and released on the compilation Foxtrot, credited to Coil. An alternate version of "London's Lost Rivers" appears on Unnatural History III as "Lost Rivers of London".

The vinyl version was limited to a pressing of 2,000 numbered copies. However, there are duplicate numbers and three colors: blue, white, and clear.

The CD has a catalogue number of ESKATON 008 and the vinyl set has a catalogue number of Eskaton 009. The CD version of this album is currently available in mp3 and aac formats at Coil's official website, Thresholdhouse.com.

Track listing

CD Release
 "Unprepared Piano" – 1:44
 "Red Skeletons" – 7:34
 "Die Wölfe kommen zurück" – 10:26
 "Refusal of Leave to Land" – 7:29
 "Stoned Circular I" – 4:30
 "Stoned Circular II" – 6:45
 "Green Water"  – 5:28
 "Cold Dream of an Earth Star" – 9:01
 "Blue Rats" – 3:10
 "Scratches and Dust" – 0:55
 "Chalice" – 8:15

2×12″ Release
Side A:
 "Unprepared Piano" – ?
 "Red Skeletons" – ?
 "Die Wölfe kommen zurück" – ?

Side B:
 "Refusal of Leave to Land" – ?
 "Stoned Circular I" – ?
 "Stoned Circular II" – ?

Side C:
 "Green Water" – ?
 "Cold Dream of an Earth Star" – ?

Side D:
 "Blue Rats" – ?
 "Scratches and Dust" – ?
 "London's Lost Rivers" – 7:38
 "Chalice" – ?

References

External links
 
 
 A Thousand Lights in a Darkened Room at Brainwashed

1996 albums
Coil (band) albums